Club Deportivo Logroño was a Spanish football team based in Logroño, Spain.

Season to season

1 season in Segunda División
5 seasons in Tercera División

Honours
 Regional Championships:
Campeonato Mancomunado de Guipúzcoa: 1932
Campeonato Mancomunado de Guipúzcoa-Navarra-Aragón y Rioja: 1934

 National competitions:
Tercera División: 1933

References

External links
CD Logroñés site 

Defunct football clubs in La Rioja (Spain)
Association football clubs established in 1922
Association football clubs disestablished in 1935
1922 establishments in Spain
1935 disestablishments in Spain
Segunda División clubs